Operation Julin was a group of 7 nuclear tests conducted by the United States in 1991–1992. These tests followed the Operation Sculpin series, and were the last before negotiations began for the Comprehensive Test Ban Treaty.

Nuclear tests

Diamond Fortune
Shot Diamond Fortune was to investigate blast flow field produced by a modern nuclear weapon. The shot was fired in a half-spherical cavity with an  radius, with a  height of burst. The floor was divided into two sections, one covered in base soil and the other in snow simulant.

Hunters Trophy
Shot Hunters Trophy was Lawrence Livermore's last nuclear test and the second to last nuclear test conducted by the United states. Its purpose was to evaluate the radiation hardness of space and high altitude systems, such as optics, sensors and materials for the Strategic Defense Initiative, and the hardness of Sandia detonators. The test consisted of a  HLOS pipe and "stub pipes" to simulate different nuclear battlefield environments.

Hunters Trophy included the experiment Hydroplus. The Defense Nuclear Agency (DNA) developed a means of verifying non-standard nuclear tests using ground peak stress and velocity at several ranges from a possible detonation point using computer hydrocodes. These codes required calibration data which was gathered at Hunters Trophy. Further Hydroplus experiments were conducted in shot Distant Zenith of Operation Sculpin.

Divider
Divider was the last nuclear test conducted by the United States.

Cancelled tests

Three tests were being prepared when the moratorium ended further nuclear testing: Icecap, Gabbs and Greenwater. 

Icecap was scheduled for spring 1993. A diagnostics canister exists at the site, weighing . The canister contains several experiments to be used in the test including THREX (threshold x-ray experiments) which used solid-state detectors to detect photon recoils given off by thin foils, PINEX (pinhole imaging neutron experiment) which used a pinhole to focus radiation onto a fluoroscope, NUEX (neutron experiment) which measured neutron output, and TOMEX (tomographic reconstruction experiment) which imaged the device using a streak camera. These experiments used line of sight (LOS) pipes to channel gamma, x-ray and neutron radiation from the device to them.

Gabbs was planned for early 1993 in Area 2. Unlike Icecap, no diagnostics canister is assembled at the site.

Greenwater, a Lawrence Livermore test, was to be fired in Area 19, and was a test of an x-ray laser system. The test was cancelled 16 July 1992. The Greenwater nuclear device had already been assembled at the time of cancellation, and had to be dismantled.

A fourth test, Mighty Uncle, was planned for 1993. This test was to be a follow-up to Hunters Trophy. Two other tests, Dolomite and Mexia were also planned. Mexia was planned for Area 19.

Both Gabbs and Greenwater were verifiable tests, meaning that under the Threshold Test Ban Treaty, Russia was permitted to have observers and measurement equipment on site to verify that the test yields did not exceed .

List of nuclear tests

Gallery

References

Explosions in 1991
Explosions in 1992
Julin
1991 in military history
1992 in military history
1991 in Nevada
1992 in Nevada
1991 in the environment
1992 in the environment